Mezvinsky may refer to:

 Edward Mezvinsky (born 1937), politician and convicted felon
 Marc Mezvinsky (born 1977), investment banker and husband of Chelsea Clinton
 Marjorie Margolies-Mezvinsky (born 1942), journalist and politician
 Norton Mezvinsky, professor

Jewish surnames